Kerr Inlet is an ice-filled inlet,  wide, located at the west side of Cape Kerr in the northern part of Barne Inlet, Antarctica. It was named by the Advisory Committee on Antarctic Names in association with Cape Kerr.

References

Inlets of Antarctica
Bodies of water of the Ross Dependency
Hillary Coast